Alli is a 1964 Indian Tamil-language film produced and directed by S. S. Rajendran, and written by Nagercoil Padmanabhan. Rajendran also stars along with R. Vijayakumari and Sowcar Janaki playing the title character. The film was released on 5 March 1964.

Plot 

Kannan is an idealistic police officer whose sense of duty transcends family ties and normal human sentiment. His loyalty to duty extends to making sure his friends and relatives, as well as his superiors, are taken into account of justice. He overcomes cognitive dissonance and performs his duty to truth and justice, even when that means arresting loved ones. At a pivotal moment of the film, he books his own beloved when he discovers her guilty of theft. The film ends with the reunion of the lovers. But Kannan's beloved, having given away her eyesight to him, enters prison as an atonement for the crime she committed early in her life.

Cast 

Male cast
 S. S. Rajendran as Kannan
 Sahasranamam as Somu
 Ashokan as the fakir
 Rajan as Babu
 Nagesh as Kathiri
 D. V. Narayanasami as S. B.

Female cast
 R. Vijayakumari Myna
 Sowcar Janaki as Alli
 Pushpalatha as Shanthi
 Baby Padmini as Uma
 Pushpavalli as the mother
 Pushpamala as Ranjitham
 Meenakumari as Meena
 Geethanjali as the dancer

Production 
S. S. Rajendran directed and produced Alli under his production company Rajendran Pictures, in addition to starring. Nagercoil Padmanabhan wrote the story and dialogue, Devan handled the editing, and Sundarababu handled the cinematography.

Soundtrack 
The soundtrack was composed by K. V. Mahadevan.

Release and reception 
Alli was released on 5 March 1964. The critic from The Indian Express likened Rajendran to a Jack of all trades, master of none, saying, "If producer-director-actor-MLA S. S. Rajendran had realised this and acted accordingly, Alli [...] would have been much more appealing. In trying to do too many things at the same time, Rajendran has taken upon himself more than he could have handled." T. M. Ramachandran of Sport and Pastime positively reviewed the film for the performances of Rajendran, Vijayakumari, Janaki and the supporting cast, in addition to Nagesh's comedy and Sundarababu's cinematography. Link also praised Rajendran and Janaki's performances. Kanthan of Kalki compared the film to Ezhai Padum Padu and Neethikkupin Paasam, saying those who did not watch those two would enjoy this.

References

External links 
 

1960s Tamil-language films
1964 directorial debut films
1964 films
Films scored by K. V. Mahadevan
Indian police films